The 1988 Cincinnati Open, also known as the Thriftway ATP Championships and Pringles Light Classic for sponsorship reasons, was a tennis tournament played on outdoor hard courts at the Lindner Family Tennis Center in Mason, Ohio, United States that was part of the 1988 Nabisco Grand Prix and 1988 WTA Tour. The women's draw was held from August 1 through August 7, 1988, while the men's draw was held from August 15 through August 21, 1988. Mats Wilander and Barbara Potter won the singles titles.

Finals

Men's singles

 Mats Wilander defeated  Stefan Edberg, 3–6, 7–6, 7–6 
 It was Wilander's 4th singles title of the year and the 30th of his career.

Women's singles

 Barbara Potter defeated  Helen Kelesi, 6–2, 6–2

Men's doubles
 Rick Leach /  Jim Pugh defeated  Jim Grabb /  Patrick McEnroe, 6–2, 6–4

Women's doubles

 Beth Herr /  Candy Reynolds defeated  Lindsay Bartlett /  Helen Kelesi, 6–2, 6–4

References

External links
 
 Association of Tennis Professionals (ATP) tournament profile

Cincinnati Open
Cincinnati Open
Cincinnati Open
1988 in sports in Ohio
Cincinnati Masters